AUDELCO, the Audience Development Committee, Inc., was established in 1973 by Vivian Robinson to honor excellence in African American theatre in New York City.

AUDELCO presents the Vivian Robinson/AUDELCO Recognition Awards (also known as Viv awards) annually. The awards were created to promote "recognition, understanding, and awareness of the arts in the African-American community."

The AUDELCO awards recognize the following Off-Broadway and Off-Off Broadway:
Productions by African-American companies
Productions written and/or directed by African-Americans
African-American actors in productions

Description 
AUDELCO has an office in Harlem, and the current president is Jacqueline Jeffries. The board of directors includes: Tony Peterson (2nd Vice-President), Ralph Carter (3rd Vice-President), Linda Armstrong (secretary), and Cherine Anderson, A. Curtis Farrow, Bambi Jones, Donna M. Mills, Mary Seymour, Dale Ricardo Shields, Terrence Spivey, and Mary B. Davis as the Chair Emeritus. The organization has thousands of members, a newsletter, and an African-American theater collection including books, photographs, slides, and scripts, as well as an extensive clippings on file of African-American theatre.

History 
A year after its founding, the Awards were designated to more specific roles in the design and production of shows such as scenic, lighting, and costume design, choreography, acting, and directing. In 1975, the Awards moved to focus on accomplishments made in particular productions. Three years later, in 1978, the rules to be nominated for an AUDELCO Award became more concrete.

The AUDELCO awards recognize productions by professional, not-for-profit theater organizations that have existed for at least two years and have had a minimum of 500 hours of rehearsal, performance, and/or training. Productions have to be performed over 12 times within the year (September 1 through August 31). Workshop productions and works-in-progress are not eligible for the awards.

These guidelines are still followed today and those nominated for Awards are chosen by a committee. In order to qualify to be a committee member, one must see an average of 100 shows in a year. Once the committee is selected, only five nominations can be considered for each category of the Awards.

AUDELCO typically hosts the award ceremony annually; however in 1996, there were no individual awards presented due to the founder Vivian Robinson passing away just a few months prior that September.

Select Awards 
Previous AUDELCO awardees include: Marsha Stephanie Blake, Chadwick Boseman, Viola Davis, George Faison, André Holland, Sanaa Lathan, Barbara Montgomery, Anika Noni Rose, André De Shields, Denzel Washington, and many others.

References

External links 
AUDELCO site
AUDELCO awards on Harlem KW Project 
https://www.nydailynews.com/new-york/audelco-picks-winners-article-1.1605167 
New York Times coverage of 1981 awards 
New York Times coverage of 1989 awards
Additional New York Times coverage of 1989 awards 
Black American Literature Forum Article on "The First Ten Years of AUDELCO".
Harlem Live 
Theater Mania 
Google Maps 133 W. 130th Street, New York, NY, 10027 / (212) 368 - 6906

American theater awards
African-American theatre